Berkan Afsarli (born 1 March 1991) is a German professional footballer who most recently played as a midfielder for Turkish club Kızılcabölükspor.

Career
In February 2015, Afsarli was diagnosed with cancer but he fully recovered and joined Denizlispor in August 2016.

References

External links
 
 
 
 Profile

1991 births
Living people
People from Lindau
Sportspeople from Swabia (Bavaria)
German people of Turkish descent
German footballers
Footballers from Bavaria
Association football midfielders
Germany youth international footballers
Süper Lig players
TFF First League players
TFF Second League players
Swiss Challenge League players
FC Wil players
Mersin İdman Yurdu
Denizlispor footballers
Pendikspor footballers
Bayrampaşaspor footballers
German expatriate footballers
German expatriate sportspeople in Switzerland
Expatriate footballers in Switzerland